Chertsey and Walton was a late 20th century parliamentary constituency in Surrey which returned one Member of Parliament (MP) to the House of Commons of the Parliament of the United Kingdom, elected by the first-past-the-post voting system.

History
The main impetus for the seat's creation was growth in housing and population across the county to allow for a new seat, North West Surrey, which took most settlements, including the expanded towns of Camberley and Egham from the old Chertsey seat.

The constituency was created for the February 1974 general election from parts of the seats of Chertsey and Esher.  It was abolished for the 1997 general election.  Its electorate returned Geoffrey Pattie, a Conservative in February 1974 and at the five successive general elections applicable to the seat.  Pattie served his time as an MP representing this seat, choosing to retire from the House in 1997.

As the voters of the forerunner constituencies had done in 1970, ultimately the electorates of the successor seats also elected Conservatives in 1997.

Boundaries
1974–1983: The Urban Districts of Chertsey, and Walton and Weybridge.  These were as defined below under the 1974 reorganisation of local government.

1983–1997: The Borough of Runnymede wards of Addlestone Bourneside, Addlestone North, Addlestone St Paul's, Chertsey Meads, Chertsey St Ann's, Foxhills, New Haw, and Woodham, and the Borough of Elmbridge wards of Hersham North, Hersham South, Oatlands Park, St George's Hill, Walton Ambleside, Walton Central, Walton North, Walton South, Weybridge North, and Weybridge South.

Members of Parliament

Geoffrey Pattie unsuccessfully contested Barking in 1970.  From 1979 to 1986 he held a string of three defence procurement roles, followed by Minister for Industry, a role under Secretaries of State who ran the Department for Trade and Industry. He was vice-chairman of the Conservative Party in 1990.  He was knighted in 1997 for his work in government.

Election results

Elections in the 1970s

Elections in the 1980s

Elections in the 1990s

References

Parliamentary constituencies in South East England (historic)
History of Surrey
Politics of Surrey